Streptomyces palmae is a bacterium species from the genus of Streptomyces which has been isolated from rhizosphere soil from the palm Elaeis guineensis in Chiang Mai in Thailand.

See also 
 List of Streptomyces species

References

External links
Type strain of Streptomyces palmae at BacDive -  the Bacterial Diversity Metadatabase

 

palmae
Bacteria described in 2016